Voetbalverenging Zwaluwen Vlaardingen is a football club from Vlaardingen, Netherlands. The club was founded in 1935. Its first squad plays in the Hoofdklasse since 2010.

History
The first squad promoted to the Derde Klasse in 1946. Since, it has been hovering between de Derde, Tweede, and Eerste Klasse. Zwaluwen won the national KNVB Amateur Cup in 1951.

In the 2021–22 season, Zwaluwen qualified for the promotion playoffs, but lost 6-2 on aggregate to RKAV Volendam in the first round.

Managers
 1947-1948: Jac van de Borden
 1948-1950: Leen van der Lee
 1950-1955: M.W. Zalmé
 1955-1957: Jan Molendijk
 1957-1959: Kees den Haan
 1959-1961: Janus van der Gijp
 1961-1966: Wout Zuidgeest
 1966-1967: Toob Remmers
 1967-1970: Gidi Jacobs
 1970-1974: Wim van Buuren
 1974-1978: Frans de Kruis
 1978-1980: Theo de Waard
 1980-1981: André Corveleyn
 1981-1984: Cor Nieuwenhuizen
 1984: Ton van der Leije (interim)
 1984-1986: Arnold Lobman
 1986-1989: Jan van der Hoek
 1989-1996: Danny Molendijk
 1996-1999: Ron van den Berg
 1999-2001: Roel den Hartog
 2001-2008: Jan de Gier
 2008-2010: Peter Wubben
 2010-2011: Ron Timmers
 2011-2013: Harry Akkermans
 2013-2015: Adrie Poldervaart
 2015-2016: Joop Hiele
 2016-2018: Oscar Biesheuvel
 2018-2019: Danny Schenkel
 Since 2019: Ralph Kalkman

References

External links
 Official site

 
Football clubs in the Netherlands
Football clubs in Vlaardingen
Association football clubs established in 1935
1935 establishments in the Netherlands